The Baltimore Orioles won their first National League pennant in 1894. They won 24 of their last 25 games. After the regular season's conclusion, the Orioles participated in the first Temple Cup competition against the second-place New York Giants. The Orioles lost to the Giants in a sweep, four games to none.

The Orioles roster contained six future Hall of Famers: Wilbert Robinson, John McGraw, Dan Brouthers, Hughie Jennings, Wee Willie Keeler and Joe Kelley. Every man in their starting line-up hit .300 for the season. They bunted, hit-and-ran, Baltimore chopped, backed up throws, cut off throws, and had pitchers cover first. They also deadened balls by icing them, tilted baselines so bunts would roll fair, and put soap around the mound so opposing pitchers would get slippery fingers if he tried to dry his hands in the dirt.

Regular season

Season standings

Record vs. opponents

Roster

Player stats

Batting

Starters by position 
Note: Pos = Position; G = Games played; AB = At bats; H = Hits; Avg. = Batting average; HR = Home runs; RBI = Runs batted in

Other batters 
Note: G = Games played; AB = At bats; H = Hits; Avg. = Batting average; HR = Home runs; RBI = Runs batted in

Pitching

Starting pitchers 
Note: G = Games pitched; IP = Innings pitched; W = Wins; L = Losses; ERA = Earned run average; SO = Strikeouts

Other pitchers 
Note: G = Games pitched; IP = Innings pitched; W = Wins; L = Losses; ERA = Earned run average; SO = Strikeouts

Relief pitchers 
Note: G = Games pitched; W = Wins; L = Losses; SV = Saves; ERA = Earned run average; SO = Strikeouts

Notes

References 
1894 Baltimore Orioles season at Baseball Reference
1894 Baltimore Orioles team page at www.baseball-almanac.com

Baltimore Orioles (1882–1899) seasons
Baltimore Orioles season
National League champion seasons
Baltimore Orioles